The Critical Foreign Dependencies Initiative (CFDI) is a strategy and list, maintained by the United States Department of Homeland Security, of foreign infrastructure which "if attacked or destroyed would critically impact the U.S." A copy of the 2008 list was redacted (removing details of names and locations) and leaked by WikiLeaks on 5 December 2010 as part of the website's leak of US diplomatic cables; no details on the exact location of the assets was included in the list. In September 2011, WikiLeaks published the unredacted copy of the list. The list's release was met with strong criticism from the US and British governments, while media and other countries have reacted less strongly saying that the entries are not secret and easily identified.

Overview
According to the Department of Homeland Security (DHS), it "Developed and executed the Critical Foreign Dependencies Initiative (CFDI) which extends our protection strategy overseas to include important foreign infrastructure that if attacked or destroyed would critically impact the U.S. The prioritized National Critical Foreign Dependencies List (NCFDL) currently contains over 300 assets and systems in over 50 countries." According to the 2009 National Infrastructure Protection Plan, the CFDI was launched by the federal government "working in close coordination and cooperation with the private sector" in 2007 "to identify assets and systems located outside the United States, which, if disrupted or destroyed, would critically affect public health and safety, the economy, or national security. The resulting strategic compendium guides engagement with foreign countries in the CIKR [critical infrastructure and key resources] protection mission area". Using an initial inventory of infrastructure located outside the United States created by the federal government, DHS and the Department of State (DOS) developed the CFDI, "a process designed to ensure that the resulting classified list of critical foreign dependencies is representative and leveraged in a coordinated and inclusive manner."

Development of the CFDI was planned in three phases, on an annual and ongoing basis. The first phase was identification, beginning with "the first-ever National Critical Foreign
Dependencies List in FY2008". This was done by the DHS working with "other Federal partners", in a process that "includes input from public and private sector CIKR community partners." Next comes prioritization, in which "DHS, in collaboration with other CIKR community partners and, in particular, DOS, prioritized the National Critical Foreign Dependencies List based on factors such as the overall criticality of the CIKR to the United States and the willingness and capability of foreign partners to engage in collaborative risk management activities." The third "involves leveraging the prioritized list to guide current and future U.S. bilateral and multilateral incident and risk management activities with foreign partners. DHS and DOS established mechanisms to ensure coordinated engagement and collaboration by public entities, in partnership with the private sector."

Disclosure
The "2008 Critical Foreign Dependencies Initiative (CFDI) list" was contained in a February 2009 diplomatic cable to the U.S. Secretary of State, Hillary Clinton, which was leaked, redacted and released in the United States diplomatic cables leak by WikiLeaks in 2010. The BBC described it as "one of the most sensitive" leaks as of 6 December 2010. In its redaction process, WikiLeaks removed only a minority of the details of names and locations, and left the rest uncensored; details of the exact location of the assets were not included in the list. In September 2011, WikiLeaks published the unredacted copy of the list. The list did not include any military facilities, but rather facilities important for the global supply chain, global communications, and economically important goods and services.

In the cable the State Department asked American diplomats to identify installations overseas "whose loss could critically impact the public health, economic security, and/or national and homeland security of the United States." The order was under the direction of the Department for Homeland Security in co-ordination with the Department of State.

In summary the list consists of Submarine communications cables, major port hubs, critical sea lanes, oil pipelines, mines, dams, and pharmaceutical facilities. A major emphasis on European pharmaceutical facilities was said by the BBC to suggest a fear of biological warfare or global pandemic.

Responses to disclosure
The cable had been classified secret and not for review by non-U.S. personnel,. The publication of the cable was followed by strong criticism from the US government and the British government, but a tepid response from news outlets and other foreign nations.

WikiLeaks spokesman Kristinn Hrafnsson said with reference to the cable: "This further undermines claims made by the US Government that its embassy officials do not play an intelligence-gathering role. Part of the cable read: "Posts are not/not being asked to consult with host governments with respect to this request." Hrafnsson later explained to The Times that the list itself "had been made available to 2.5 million people including military personnel and private contractors by the U.S. government". He went on to say: "in terms of security issues, while this cable details the strategic importance of assets across the world, it does not give any information as to their exact locations, security measures, vulnerabilities or any similar factors, though it does reveal the U.S. asked its diplomats to report back on these matters."

United States
US State Department spokesman P.J. Crowley denounced the disclosure saying it "gives a group like al-Qaeda a targeting list." Anthony Cordesman, a 'national security analyst for the Center for Strategic and International Studies', said: "this has given a global map – a menu, if not a recipe book – to every extremist group in the world. To me it would be amazing to see how WikiLeaks could rationalize this." However, Alistair Millar, 'director of the Center on Global Counterterrorism Cooperation', said: "it's a little different...than with diplomatic cable leaks...in this case, this is largely information available to everyone if they really wanted to look."

Janet Napolitano, the Secretary of Homeland Security, said the list "could jeopardize our national security".

Nations other than the United States
A spokesman for British prime minister David Cameron said: "The leaks and their publication are damaging to national security in the United States, Britain and elsewhere. It is vital that governments are able to operate on the basis of confidentiality of information."

Vic Toews, the Public Safety Minister of Canada, seemed "unconcerned or unaware" of the release of the list. He said: "I don't follow gossip very much so I don't really know the impact of WikiLeaks, but I can assure you that the security agencies in Canada are following it very closely and to the extent that I need to be involved and address those issues, they will brief me on the issues."

Lin Yu-fang, a politician in Taiwan, stated, in regards to the revealing of the six undersea telecommunications cables in China, there are "actually no secrets concerning the cables", but he said there "could be certain thorny political or military issues involving Taiwan, the U.S. or Japan if more sensitive secrets were exposed".

News outlets
A CBS article elaborating on the release stated that "although much of the information contained [in the list] was already in the public domain, officials in Washington and London have been quick to condemn WikiLeaks for publishing it, calling the act evidence of the organization's willingness to potentially aid terror groups in its mission to reveal U.S. secrets." The New York Times stated that the list "appears largely limited to sites that any would-be terrorist with Internet access and a bit of ingenuity might quickly have identified."

The Lancashire Evening Post pointed out in an article that the list "contains information on defence sites in Lancashire which is more than five years out of date." The article specifically pointed out that the "Royal Ordnance (RO) site at Chorley...has been developed as Buckshaw Village for the past five years" and the "BAE facility in Plymouth, Devon...[was] sold as part of a deal three years ago."

Companies
Mayne Pharma told the Herald-Sun that "its entry on a classified diplomatic cable is out-of-date and full of errors", since the drug listed on the cable as its resource, a snake anti-venom, hasn't been made by the company for "more than ten years".

Roger Aston, the chief executive of Mayne Pharma, said: "I can only go on what I can see now in the media (about WikiLeaks) but judging from what I've seen about what they've said about Mayne Pharma and Faulding, a lot of it (the information) is old, out of date stuff that's not relevant."

Dean Veverka of Southern Cross concurred, saying, "(Roger Aston's comments) that the information in the WikiLeaks document was ten years out of date could be accurate. To only list Southern Cross as the only internet cable network here might have been relevant 10 years ago (when only coaxial cables were available), but Australia now has seven cables going out of country. Australia has a very resilient network nowadays."

Bill Gorman, sales director of David Brown Ltd., said: "We make gearboxes for our platinum and gold mines. We have supplied equipment via the US for other countries, but have only once exported directly to the States, for a copper mine seven years ago. I have no idea why we're on the list."

A BAE Systems spokeswoman said: "The information in the list was incorrect. The site in Plymouth was sold in 2007, and in Chorley, there are no longer any weapons manufacturing, although there is still an office there. The information about Preston was correct. The safety and security of our people and facilities is of highest priority."

References

External links
 The original cable at WikiLeaks. Archived on 10 April 2012.

United States diplomatic cables leak
United States Department of Homeland Security
Infrastructure
Classified documents